Clark Hoss (born February 19, 1949) is a former American football tight end. He played for the Philadelphia Eagles in 1972.

References

1949 births
Living people
Players of American football from Portland, Oregon
American football tight ends
Oregon State Beavers football players
Philadelphia Eagles players
Portland Thunder (WFL) players
Detroit Wheels players